Justin Bakker (born 3 March 1998) is a Dutch professional footballer who plays as a defender for Veikkausliiga club KuPS.

Club career
Bakker played in the youth of AZ, where he won the Tweede Divisie championship with the second team of AZ, Jong AZ, in the 2016–17 season. He made his professional debut in the Eerste Divisie on 18 August 2017, in a 1–3 away win over FC Den Bosch. On 14 December 2016, he was part of the AZ first-team squad for the KNVB Cup match against ASWH, but he did not make an appearance. The following day, he signed a contract extension, keeping him part of AZ until 2020. 

On 10 September 2020, Bakker joined Go Ahead Eagles as a free agent on a one-year contract with an option for an extra year. Prior to signing, he had been on a trial with the club and impressed the coaching staff. On 2 October, he made his debut the club in a 2–3 home loss to Jong FC Utrecht as a replacement for the injured starter, Jeroen Veldmate.

On 31 January 2023, Bakker joined Finnish club Kuopion Palloseura on a two-year contract with an option for an extra year.

Honours 
Jong AZ
Tweede Divisie: 2016–17

References

External links
 

1998 births
Footballers from Amsterdam
Living people
Dutch footballers
Netherlands youth international footballers
Association football defenders
Jong AZ players
Go Ahead Eagles players
Kuopion Palloseura players
Eerste Divisie players
Eredivisie players
Dutch expatriate footballers
Expatriate footballers in Finland
Dutch expatriate sportspeople in Finland